Gbemisola Adeoti is a Nigerian academic and poet. He is a professor of literature in the English Department at Obafemi Awolowo University. He is the author of Naked Soles which was at a time recommended by the Joint Admission and Matriculation Board. Between 2011 and 2015, he served as the Director of the Institute of Cultural Studies, and he was the Dean of the Faculty of Arts from 2015 to 2019 at OAU.

References

Living people

Year of birth missing (living people)
Academic staff of Obafemi Awolowo University